An academic history can be a large, multivolume work such as the Cambridge Modern History, written collaboratively under some central editorial control. 

In the 19th century the idea appeared in universities that a definitive history could be written of a major region of the world for a great span of time - in a similar manner to the way in which people compiled an encyclopedia. The chosen time period was subdivided into eras and one volume specified for each. Within each volume there would be a fixed number of topics. Either each volume would be written by one historian on the faculty, or else each topic would be handled by a faculty member throughout the series of volumes, or perhaps another system of specialization would be prescribed. This procedure resembled that undertaken on such campuses to produce encyclopedias of natural history, such as marine biology, for which different scholars would write about different phyla. Examples of the end result of this procedure include the series produced by  Cambridge on Greco-Roman history, and that of  Oxford on British history, which may be found on the reserve stacks of many public libraries in the 21st century.  

What gives this concept of "academic history" its own historicity, or "cubbyhole in time", challenged by progress, is that an academic history was intended to be definitive even though its subject matter, unlike the marine biology mentioned above, was not objective. When the volume on the  Regency was published, for example, some may have thought that such would be the complete history of that era, and no one would need to do as much work in that field, because the best people with the best resources would already have written it down. Subsequent changes in scholarly perspective can alter that perception; for example the work of Lewis Namier on mid-18th century British politics caused one of the Oxford History volumes to appear outdated.

It was not considered that entirely new viewpoints and methods would come into being, or that scholars would follow new threads of causality throughout stretches of time that differed from the canonical ones over a region which varied over time. And as each academic history was primarily a list of persons, places, things, and events, there was hardly any Marxian content to any of these projects. By the second half of the 20th century there weren't any more new academic histories. Historians no longer subdivided their subject-matter in such an assembly-line fashion with such an authoritative result expected. 

However, the project of globalization has brought with it the notion of writing a history that has no national center. All the academic-history projects mentioned above, allocated to the faculty of a university, had the viewpoint of their country or region in mind. Some new global histories resemble the academic histories, in that they are large and done by many people using a similar process of allocation, but they do not have the same all-specifying concept of classification; instead, it is interrelation which is of concern.

See also 
 Academia
 History of scholarship

Historiography